Theodore Gerardus Maria Lenssen (born May 17, 1952) is a former Dutch-Canadian ice hockey goaltender.

Lenssen played for the Netherlands men's national ice hockey team at the 1980 Winter Olympics in Lake Placid, and the following year he competed for the Netherlands at the 1981 World Ice Hockey Championships.

References

External links

1952 births
Living people
Canadian people of Dutch descent
Des Moines Capitols players
Dutch ice hockey goaltenders
Heerenveen Flyers players
Ice hockey people from Ontario
Ice hockey players at the 1980 Winter Olympics
Johnstown Jets players
Kalamazoo Wings (1974–2000) players
London Knights players
Olympic ice hockey players of the Netherlands
Omaha Knights (CHL) players
Sportspeople from Oakville, Ontario